Herman Naber (November 12, 1826 – April 11, 1909) was an American farmer, politician, and jurist.

Born in what is now Germany, Naber emigrated to the United States in 1848 and settled first in Dodge County, Wisconsin and then moved to Shawano, Shawano County, Wisconsin in 1858 where he farmed. Naber served on the Dodge and Shawano Counties Boards of Supervisors. He was a Presidential elector in the 1876 election for the Democrat. In 1875 and 1876, Naber was mayor of Shawano, Wisconsin and also served as county judge for Shawano County. In 1864, 1875, 1880, and 1883, Naber served in the Wisconsin State Assembly and was an Independent Democrat. Naber died in Shawano, Wisconsin.

Notes

1826 births
1909 deaths
German emigrants to the United States
People from Dodge County, Wisconsin
People from Shawano, Wisconsin
Farmers from Wisconsin
Wisconsin Independents
Wisconsin state court judges
County supervisors in Wisconsin
Mayors of places in Wisconsin
19th-century American politicians
19th-century American judges
Democratic Party members of the Wisconsin State Assembly